The United Officers' Group (Spanish, Grupo de Oficiales Unidos) or GOU was a nationalist secret society within the Argentine Army which staged a coup d'état in 1943 to overthrow President Ramón Castillo, thus ending the Infamous Decade and forming a military junta which lasted until 1945. Arturo Rawson was made President, but was only in office for a few days before the GOU replaced him with Pedro Pablo Ramírez.

History
The GOU started to operate somewhere in the beginning of the 1940s, after the time Colonel Juan Perón returned from Europe. In his book Yo, Juan Domingo Perón, Perón described that the people that would be part of the GOU shared his ideas about the promotion of trade unions and labor rights, and wanted to prevent further acts of electoral fraud by the Infamous Decade. However, Perón was concerned in that the group would be aiming to make a mere coup d'état, without planning in advance the social changes they intended to implement. 

As with most secret societies, secrecy makes historian's work difficult, and the specific details about the internal work of the society are unrecorded, incomplete or contradictory. One of those details is the creation of the GOU: according to a report by Domingo Mercante, the GOU was created by him and Perón, between the end of 1942 and May 1943, while Juan Carlos Montes claimed to be the creator with Urbano de La Vega. Both former members of the GOU did not point any specific ideology as the point in common between members, but the need to unite the officers opposed to Agustín Pedro Justo.

Members
The original members of the GOU were 19 officers, without a chief. Other members joined later. The recorded list of original members is as follows, in the original order:

 Domingo Mercante
 Severo Eizaguirre
 Raúl Pízzales
 León Bengoa
 Francisco Filippi
 Juan Carlos Montes
 Julio A. Lagos
 Mario Villagrán
 Fernando González
 Eduardo Arias Duval
 Agustín de la Vega
 Arturo Saavedra
 Bernardo Guillentegui
 Héctor Ladvocat
 Bernardo Menéndez
 Urbano de la Vega Aguirre
 Enrique P. González
 Emilio Ramírez
 Juan Domingo Perón
 
The officers that joined the GOU afterwards are as follows

 Eduardo Jorge Avalos
 Aristóbulo Mittelbach
 Alfredo A. Baisi
 Oscar Uriondo
 Tomás Ducó
 Heraclio Ferrazano
 Alfredo Arguero Fragueyro

Presidents Arturo Rawson, Pedro Pablo Ramírez and Edelmiro Farrell had close ties to the GOU, but were not members themselves.

Nature of the GOU
Little information exists about the GOU. Felipe Pigna suggests that GOU members were nationalist sympathisers of Nazi Germany and Fascist Italy, but Noberto Galasso argues that there is no conclusive evidence for that in documents, reports or confirmed events. Silvano Santander wrote the book Técnica de una traición with documents that would prove that Juan Domingo Perón and Eva Perón were agents of Nazism. Uruguayan Eduardo Víctor Haedo was accused as well, which motivated an investigation by the Uruguayan Congress: it turned out that the documents used were forged. There is also a resolution supporting Adolf Hitler, but it is considered another forgery: none of the members of the GOU acknowledged it, and it was unsigned, whereas all GOU resolutions were signed. 

On a general level, the military of Argentina was influenced by the German military, but this influence was dated from decades before the rise of Nazism. This influence was also limited to the military topics, and did not include the ideas of political organization.

Bibliography

References

Anti-communism in Argentina
Far-right politics in Argentina
History of Argentina (1943–1955)
Infamous Decade
Military history of Argentina
Organizations established in the 1940s
American secret societies